Thunderbird Adventist Academy (TAA) is a private Seventh-day Adventist Christian high school and boarding academy in Scottsdale, Arizona, United States. It is a part of the Seventh-day Adventist education system, the world's second largest Christian school system.

History
In 1900, the Seventh-day Adventist Church created an elementary school in Phoenix. It expanded to include an intermediate school after several years. The need for an academy was becoming clear as more Seventh-day Adventists moved to Arizona. Finally, in 1920, Arizona Academy opened in northeast Phoenix with two dormitories and classes taught on the lower levels.

In 1953, the Seventh-day Adventist Church bought Thunderbird Field#2, an Army air base that included almost 600 acres of land, from the federal government. The school, now under its current name, moved to the former air base, and up until the 1970s and construction of new facilities, the school used the old Army buildings on site. Former hangars became a wood products industry and a vocational education center offering woodworking, welding and mechanics training, while the field itself was used to train missionary pilots. In 1963, to finance renovations, TAA commissioned an industrial park to surround the airport. In 1966, the city of Scottsdale bought the airfield.

Academics
Academics offered at Thunderbird Adventist Academy range from entry level classes to Advanced Placement in math, science, and English.

Thunderbird Adventist Academy offers two types of diplomas, a standard and a college preparatory diploma. The requirements for the latter are more stringent; a student must complete three or four years of mathematics and three or four years of science. Students who have a cumulative GPA of 3.5 to 3.75 will graduate with honors; those who have a GPA of 3.75 or higher will graduate with high honors.

TAA is accredited through the Western Association of Schools & Colleges and the Adventist Accrediting Association.

Spiritual aspects
All students take religion classes each year. These classes cover topics in biblical history and Christian and denominational doctrines. Instructors in other disciplines begin each class period with prayer or a short devotional thought, many of which encourage student input. The entire student body gathers together each week in the auditorium for an hour-long chapel service. Outside the classrooms there is year-round spiritually oriented programming that relies on student involvement.

Athletics
All students in grades 9-12 are required to take three years of physical education classes. The high school is a full member of the Canyon Athletic Association. The school fields varsity teams in baseball, softball, basketball (boys and girls), boys' fall soccer, and volleyball (boys and girls).  They also have the Wings Acrobatic Team.

Campus ministries
The school offers campus ministry services, such as on-campus Sabbath services; student-led Sabbath School classes; evangelism and mission trips; and ministry outreach.

Notable alumni
Sergeant Aaron Cruttenden, killed by small-arms fire in Afghanistan on November 7, 2010

See also

 List of Seventh-day Adventist secondary schools
 Seventh-day Adventist education

References

External links

Adventist secondary schools in the United States
Private high schools in Arizona
Educational institutions established in 1920
Schools in Maricopa County, Arizona
1920 establishments in Arizona